In mathematics, the AKNS system is an integrable system of partial differential equations, introduced by and named after Mark J. Ablowitz, David J. Kaup, Alan C. Newell, and Harvey Segur from their publication in Studies in Applied Mathematics:  .

Definition

The AKNS system is a pair of two partial differential equations for two complex-valued functions p and q of 2 variables t and x:

If p and q are complex conjugates this reduces to the nonlinear Schrödinger equation. 

Huygens' principle applied to the Dirac operator gives rise to the AKNS hierarchy.

See also
 Huygens principle

References

Integrable systems